The Tesat-Spacecom GmbH & Co. KG (TESAT) from Backnang, Germany is an independently operating subsidiary of Airbus Defence and Space which develops, produces and tests communication payloads for international satellite manufacturers.

Company

History 

In 1949, the AEG (Allgemeine Elektricitäts Gesellschaft AG) business area telecommunications technology was relocated from Berlin to Backnang.

In 1955, AEG's microwave radio relay division was relocated from Ulm to Backnang, and Telefunken GmbH was founded.

On March 1, 1967, the AEG Telefunken AG was founded with the aerospace specialty and the focus on development, sales, assembly and testing.

In 1982, the company was transformed into a GmbH, AEG Telefunken Nachrichtentechnik GmbH. AEG-Telefunken continued to hold the majority with 51% of the shareholder shares, 49% went to a consortium of Robert Bosch GmbH, Mannesmann and Allianz.

In 1983, as part of the AEG-Telefunken settlement application, the group's share was withdrawn by the three co-shareholders and divided in the same proportion as the previous shareholder base. The company now operated under the name ANT Nachrichtentechnik GmbH.

In 1995, ANT Nachrichtentechnik GmbH was transferred to Bosch Telecom GmbH. In 2000, the Bosch space product division was transferred to an independent company, Bosch SatCom GmbH.

2001 was the founding year of Tesat-Spacecom GmbH & Co.KG. In November 2001, Bosch SatCom GmbH was renamed Tesat-Spacecom GmbH & Co.KG and was acquired by EADS Astrium GmbH in December 2001. TESAT was expanded to produce intelligence payloads for satellites and remained as an independent company.

In February 2022 TESAT announced to establish a manufacturing facility in the United States.

Milestones
 1971: TESAT was involved in their first space project with the Intelsat IV.
 1989: Become the main Contractor for Deutsche Telekom Kopernikus Satellites.
 2006: Major Supplier for first Bundeswehr Satellite SAR-Lupe.
 2007: First flight of TESAT‘s Laser Communication Terminal (LCT) on the Near Field Infrared Experiment (NFIRE) (First ISL with TerraSAR-X in 2008).
 2013: TESAT manufactures the 10,000th EPC.
 2018: More than 10.000 established Laser links in space.

Finances

Products 
TESAT's product portfolio ranges from individual components to payloads and complete systems. These are supplied by TESAT to satellite manufacturers worldwide. Among the equipment and systems manufactured for satellite telecommunications are high-power amplifiers such as traveling wave tube amplifiers (TWTA) and their power supplies electronic power conditioner (EPC). TESAT's other product segments include channel amplifiers, filters, multiplexers, modulators, transmitters and TTC transponders.

Active Products

 Microwave Power Module (MPM)
 Solid State Power Amplifier (SSPA)
 Electronic Power Conditioner (EPC)
 Linearized Channel Amplifier (LCAMP)
 Traveling-wave Tube Amplifier (TWTA)
 Multiport Amplifier (MPA)

Passive Products
 Multiplexer & Demultiplexer (IMUX/OMUX)
 Waveguide Switches
 Assemblies

Datalink Products
 Modulators
 Telemetry, Tracking & Command (TT&C) Transponder
 Downlink Transmitters

Laser Products

 Laser Communication Terminals

Services
 Manufacturing, testing, engineering
 In-orbit commissioning
 EEE Parts Agency

See also
 Airbus Defence and Space
 Laser communication in space
 Telefunken

References

External links 
 

Airbus Defence and Space
Aerospace companies of Europe
Laser communication in space
Telecommunications companies established in 2001
Manufacturing companies established in 2001
German companies established in 2001
Companies based in Baden-Württemberg